Mecyclothorax loebli is a species of ground beetle in the subfamily Psydrinae. It was described by Baehr in 2002.

References

loebli
Beetles described in 2002